BLC Bank SAL (BLC:LB) is a Lebanese financial institution offering banking, insurance and asset management services. BLC Bank subsidiaries are BLC Finance SAL and BLC Services SAL.

BLC Bank SAL is a Lebanese joint stock company registered under No.1952 in the Lebanese Commercial Register.

Historical overview 
BLC Bank was founded in the early 1950s in Beirut by the Abou Jaoudeh family. It was previously named Banque Libanaise pour le Commerce, renamed to BLC Bank in the end of 2004.

In 1956, the bank established a foreign presence with the establishment of BLC Bank SA in France which itself opened four branches in the UAE in 1973.

BLC Finance SAL was established in 1998. Its main activities include fund management, proprietary trading, floor brokerage and margin lending.

After a failed attempt to merge with the Byblos Bank, in 1999 BLC merged with Union Bank of Lebanon (UBL) group which then included many smaller banks.

In 2002, following mismanagement at the senior management level, the Central Bank of Lebanon—Banque du Liban (BDL) -- stepped in and acquired the Bank's shares. Riad Salameh, governor of the BDL, appointed a senior management team led by Shadi Karam, to restructure and re-establish BLC Bank.

By the end of 2004, BLC Bank (renamed as part of the complete process of restructuring and recapitalization) occupied the 12th spot among the largest banks in Lebanon in terms of assets and customer deposits. BLC was the first bank in Lebanon to provide micro credit loans focusing on the small enterprises as a main business line.

During this same year, the Bank entered the insurance market and created a fully owned subsidiary, BLC Services SAL, to handle this business.

In December 2005, the Qatar Supreme Council for Economic Affairs and Investment acquired the Banque du Liban's shares in BLC Bank SAL. This was followed by a capital increase of $100 million in early 2006 to allow the bank to further grow its business activities. Subsequently, in May 2006, the Supreme Council for Economic Affairs and Investment transferred its ownership in BLC Bank SAL to the Qatar Investment Authority (QIA), a governmental agency responsible for the ownership and management of the State of Qatar's assets both nationally and internationally.

In August 2007, Fransabank SAL, the fourth largest banking institution in Lebanon, acquired from the Qatar Investment Authority (QIA) 97.52% of the capital of BLC Bank SAL after the latter had finalized the successful sell off of its French subsidiary, BLC Bank SAL (France) to QIA. As a result of this, BLC Bank SAL Lebanon ceased to have any shareholding in BLC Bank SAL (France)

In April 2008, Maurice Sehnaoui was appointed Chairman of the Board and General Manager after becoming one of the main shareholders.

In September 2009, BLC Bank acquired 100% of Lati Bank - Lebanon's shares.

Also in 2009, BLC Bank launched its Private Banking division to serve its high-net-worth clientele.

In September 2010, BLC Bank acquired 9.9% of the shares of USB Bank PLC - Cyprus and in March 2011, the Bank further increased its ownership to a 95.61% shareholding of the said bank.

As of January 27, 2011, BLC Bank has listed preferred shares on the Beirut Stock Exchange. Class A shares were issued in early 2011, and Class B shares were issued in late 2011.

Shareholder structure 
BLC Bank shareholding structure is as follows:

 Fransabank 68.58%

Established in 1921 and listed as the oldest bank in Lebanon.
 Holding M. Sehnaoui SAL 18.44%

Holding M. Sehnaoui SAL was established in 2000 and is majority owned by Maurice Sehnaoui.
 FransaInvest Bank (FIB)  6.25%

FransaInvest Bank (FIB) is the fully owned investment subsidiary of Fransabank SAL.
 
 Silver Capital Holding 4.86%

Silver Capital Holding SAL was established in 2005. Its main shareholders include members of the Ziade Family.
 Others 1.87%

References 
ATFP (Arab Trade Financing Program)

ATFP: 
ATFP: 

Beirut Stock Exchange:

Reuters:

International Finance Corporation (IFC)

Trade Finance Magazine

The Case for BLC Bank, By Thomas Schellen and Gareth Smyth

External links
 Official Website

References 

Banks of Lebanon
1950 establishments in Asia
Companies based in Beirut
Companies listed on the Beirut Stock Exchange